Vet, VET or the Vet may refer to:
 Veterinary physician, a professional who treats disease, disorder and injury in animals
 Veterinary medicine, the branch of science that deals with animals
 Veteran, a person with long experience in a particular area, most often in military service during wartime
 Veterans Stadium, informally "The Vet", a former sports stadium in Philadelphia, Pennsylvania
 Veterans Stadium (New Britain, Connecticut)
 Vet River, South Africa
 Finnish Board of Film Classification, an institution of the Finnish Ministry of Education
 Venezuelan Standard Time, a UTC-04:00 time zone
 Vocational education and training, prepares trainees for jobs that are based on manual or practical activities
 Sebastian Vettel, a German F1 driver

See also 
 Vette (disambiguation)
 Vetting, a process of an evaluation